Michael Rotenberg is a Canadian television and film producer and entertainment manager.

Career 
In 1991, Rotenberg, alongside Erwin Stoff and Howard Klein, co-founded 3 Arts Entertainment, a talent management and television film/production company. In 2003, the company received a television deal with 20th Century Fox Television  and in 2018, Lionsgate acquired a majority stake in the company.

Rotenberg has produced television shows including King of the Hill, Everybody Hates Chris, It's Always Sunny in Philadelphia, Insecure, Silicon Valley and American Vandal.

Rotenberg has been nominated for a Grammy 14 times. Rotenberg has won an award for Outstanding Variety, Music or Comedy Special as for HBO’s Chris Rock: Bring the Pain in 1997 and Outstanding Animated Program (For Programming One Hour or Less) as executive producer for FOX’s King of The Hill in 1999.

He is the executive producer on Apple TV+’s Mythic Quest: Raven’s Banquet, FX’s It’s Always Sunny In Philadelphia, NBC's Lopez vs Lopez, Paramount TV+'s Beavis & Butthead and Amazon Freevee series Sprung.

He also produced the animated film that is currently streaming on Paramount+, Beavis and Butt-Head Do the Universe. Other films he has produced include Encino Man, Office Space and Son-In-Law. He also serves as executive producer on the following upcoming television shows: Apple TV+'s Manhunt, Paramount TV+'s reboot of Beavis and Butthead, and Paramount TV+ in collaboration with Comedy Central's reboot of Everybody Still Hates Chris.

3 Arts has produced television shows such as The Office, Parks and Recreation, The Mindy Project, Brooklyn Nine-Nine, Unbreakable Kimmy Schmidt, American Vandal, The Good Place as well as produced films including Edge of Tomorrow, Unbroken, Constantine, The Devil’s Advocate, I Am Legend, Office Space, The Matrix, and 13 Hours: The Secret Soldiers of Benghazi.

Early life and education 
Rotenberg grew up in Toronto, Ontario and studied law at the University of Windsor, He was admitted to practice in Upper Canada as well as in California. He worked in business affairs at The Samuel Goldwyn Company, and as an attorney at Loeb & Loeb and Gipson, Hoffman. He transitioned into management to work with Sandy Gallin.

Filmography

Film

Television

Awards

References

External links 
 

Canadian film producers
Living people
American film producers
Canadian talent agents
Year of birth missing (living people)